Newport Township is a township in Barton County, Missouri, USA.  As of the 2000 census, its population was 354.

The township takes its name from Newport, Missouri.

Geography
According to the USGS, it contains one cemetery, Cook.

The streams of Cold Branch and Painter Branch run through this township.

References

 USGS Geographic Names Information System (GNIS)

External links
 US-Counties.com
 City-Data.com

Townships in Barton County, Missouri
Townships in Missouri